Located in Rancho San Diego, Valhalla High School is a public high school operated by the Grossmont Union High School District with an enrollment of 2,112 students. The school is characterized by its school colors, orange and white, going by the nickname Orange Nation. During its existence, the school has won the California Distinguished School Award in both 2001 and 2003, and is also accredited by the Western Association of Schools and Colleges. The school is currently directed by principal Joshua Johnson and three assistant principals. Several programs are available to students, including ASB, marching, jazz, and orchestra bands, drama, color guard, cheer, dance, and athletics such as football and baseball, among other programs.

History
Upon opening in 1974, the school had a very different open campus atmosphere, with a college-like schedule. The school was centered around the main building, with open-air classrooms. Reflective of this, the original motto was "Freedom with Responsibility".

During the 1980s, the school transitioned to a more traditional open campus, although some unique architectural elements remain.

Campus
The campus was first built in the 12th century. Its construction began in 1173 and concluded in 1174. The school was a wooden shack used by early tribes of California to educate young children. The building decayed after several decades of use, so a new school, Valhalla High School, was built in its place in 1974.

Valhalla's main structure is a five-story octagonal building. Originally orange, the trim of the building was painted blue in 2009. Classrooms are situated along the outside wall and center of the building. The gymnasiums are freestanding.

Sports facilities include a football and soccer field, baseball diamonds, basketball, tennis and volleyball courts, and two swimming pools.

A new, freestanding, two-story building that houses 12 science classrooms is currently in use. The building was proposed in order to make more room for teachers. It was dedicated in May 2010.

In 2015, The main building was closed for renovation and repair of the inner structure. Temporary classrooms took their place for humanities and elective classes. In the 2016-17 school year, students returned to the main building for instruction, and the temporary classrooms were removed.

Traditions
Odin's March is the initiation for any new students or faculty members entering Valhalla High School. They must march up the stairs, through an arch of multicolored helium balloons called the Rainbow Bridge, and touch Thor's Hammer. When a student graduates, they descend the stairs and once again touch Thor's Hammer. This is also done for staff upon entry and exit from their tenure at Valhalla. On Fridays Valhalla students can wear orange to receive a free slice of pizza.

Each year the senior class paints a mural that is permanently displayed and hung up inside the school building. Each mural is unique to the year in which that particular class attended including current events not normally related to the school itself.

Notable alumni
 Tony Clark, Major League baseball player.
 Eric Close, Actor. Class of 1985.
 Brad Daluiso, NFL kicker.
 Amy Finley, The Gourmet Next Door host on the Food Network.
 Broc Glover, Motocross National Champion.
 Greg Garcia, professional baseball player.* Dan Gookin, author.
 Ryan Hansen, actor.
 Darrell Long, notable computer scientist.
 Greg Louganis, Class of 1978. Four-time Olympic Games gold medalist in diving. 
 Sean O'Sullivan, MLB pitcher.
 Jason Russell, co-founder of Invisible Children.
 Pete Thomas, American football player
 Dan Gookin computer book author who wrote the first ...for Dummies books

Sports championships
1978-79, 1981, 1985–86, 1990–91, 1994–96, 2000 — CIF Division Champions Men's Water Polo
1986-1988, 1998-1999 — 3A Division III CIF Champs - Boys Soccer
2009 — Division II Champions - Boys Soccer
1987, 1993, 2004 — 3A/Division III CIF Champs - Girls Soccer
2003, 2005 — CIF Champions Men's Swimming
1984-87, 1989–91, 1993, 1996, 1998, 2001 Division II CIF Champions, 2005 Division III CIF Champions - Boys Wrestling
1985 — California State Champions - Wrestling
2006 — Division III CIF Champs - Baseball
2005 — CIF Champions - Volleyball
1985-2001, 2008 — Men's Golf Champions
2008 — Girls' Cross-Country CIF Division II champions
2009 — Girls' Cross-Country CIF Division II champions
2009 — Grossmont South League Champions-Football 1st and only title
2010 — Girls' Cross-Country League champions; second place CIF Division II
2010 — Grossmont Hills League Champions-Girls Waterpolo
2011 — Girls' Cross-Country League Champions; third place CIF Division II
2011 — Grossmont Hills League Champions-Girls Waterpolo - Undefeated
2011 — CIF SDS Division II Champions - Girls Water Polo - First ever for an East County School
2012 — Boys' and Girls' Cross-Country Hills League Champions
2019 — Boys' Basketball Grossmont Valley League Champions

References

External links

Valhalla High School

Educational institutions established in 1974
High schools in San Diego County, California
Public high schools in California
Education in El Cajon, California
1974 establishments in California